Van Schaik is a Dutch toponymic surname meaning "from/of Schaik". Variants include Van Schaaik, Van Schaick, Van Schaïk, Van Schaijk and Van Schayk. While the latter two forms usually refer to an origin in Schaijk in North Brabant, the more common forms have an origin in multiple (small) places in the Rhine delta named Schaik (etc.), Schadijk, or the original Schadewijk (possibly "shaded place"). People with the surname include:

Andre van Schaik, Australian engineer
Carel van Schaik (born 1953), Dutch primatologist
Henri van Schaik (1899-1991), Dutch horse rider
Jarad van Schaik (born 1988), American soccer player
Josef van Schaik (1882–1962), Dutch politician, Minister of Justice and Deputy Prime Minister 
Max van Schaik (born 1991), Dutch basketball player
 (born 1967), Dutch jazz singer
Sam van Schaik (born 1972), English Tibetologist
Steef van Schaik (1888–1968), Dutch politician, Minister of Infrastructure, brother of Josef
Van Schaaik
Erik van Schaaik (born 1968), Dutch animator
Van Schaijk / Van Schayk
Toer van Schayk (born 1936), Dutch ballet dancer, choreographer, and artist

See also
17980 Vanschaik, main-belt asteroid named after a science fair winning graduate school student (Katherine Van Schaik)
Van Schaick

References

Dutch-language surnames
Surnames of Dutch origin
Toponymic surnames